The 1975 New Zealand general election was held on 29 November to elect MPs to the 38th session of the New Zealand Parliament. It was the first general election in New Zealand where 18- to 20-year-olds and all permanent residents of New Zealand were eligible to vote, although only citizens were able to be elected.

The National Party, led by Rob Muldoon, won 55 of the 87 seats over the Labour Party, led by Bill Rowling. The election saw the defeat of the Third Labour Government after only three years in office and the formation of the Third National Government. As of 2023, this is the most recent election where a government was voted out after one term.

Background
The incumbent Labour Party, following the sudden death of Labour leader Norman Kirk, was led by Bill Rowling, a leader who was characterised as being weak and ineffectual by some political commentators. Labour's central campaign was the so-called "Citizens for Rowling" petition which attacked National leader Robert Muldoon's forthright leadership style. This campaign was largely seen as having backfired on Labour.

The National Party responded with the formation of "Rob's Mob". As former Minister of Finance in the previous National government, Muldoon focused on the economic impact of Labour's policies; National's campaign advertising suggested that Labour's recently introduced compulsory personal superannuation scheme would result in the government owning the New Zealand economy by using the worker's money, akin to a communist state. Muldoon argued that his New Zealand superannuation scheme could be funded from future taxes rather than an additional tax on current wages.

In July 1974, Muldoon as opposition leader had promised to cut immigration and to "get tough" on law and order issues. He criticised the Labour government's immigration policies for contributing to the economic recession and a housing shortage which undermined the New Zealand "way of life".

During the 1975 general elections, the National Party had also played an electoral advertisement that was later criticized for stoking negative racial sentiments about Polynesian migrants.

The campaign also achieved notoriety due to an infamous television commercial featuring "Dancing Cossacks", which was produced by Hanna Barbera on behalf of National's ad agency Colenso.

A consummate orator and a skilled television performer, Muldoon's powerful presence on screen increased his popularity with voters.

MPs retiring in 1975
Four National MPs and Three Labour MPs intended to retire at the end of the 37th Parliament.

Opinion polling

Results

The final results saw National win 55 seats, and Labour 32 seats. Thus Robert Muldoon replaced Bill Rowling as Prime Minister, ending the term of the Third Labour government, and beginning the term of the Third National government.  The party seat numbers were an exact opposite of the 1972 election. No minor parties won seats, though the election saw the best ever result for New Zealand's first green political party, Values. There were 1,953,050 electors on the roll, with 1,603,733 (82.11%) voting.

While Muldoon would be re-elected twice, this would be the only time between 1969 and 1990 that National polled more votes than Labour.

Notable electorate results included the election of two Māori MPs to general seats; the first time that any Māori had been elected to a non-Māori electorate since James Carroll in 1893. The MPs in question were Ben Couch in Wairarapa and Rex Austin in Awarua.

Votes summary

The table below shows the results of the 1975 general election:

Key

|-
 |colspan=8 style="background-color:#FFDEAD" | General electorates
|-

|-
 |colspan=8 style="background-color:#FFDEAD" | Māori electorates
|-

|}
Table footnotes:

Notes

References

External links
Mr Nathan the National candidate for Island Bay below a defaced poster (photo)

 
November 1975 events in New Zealand
1975 elections in New Zealand
1970s in New Zealand